The Historische Lexikon Bayerns (abbr: HLB) or Historical Lexicon of Bavaria is a  specialist, historical lexicon about the History of Bavaria, which has been published as a genuine online publication. It is the first specialised lexicon on the history of the Free State of Bavaria and its various regions.

History and development 
The concept of publishing an online encyclopedia on the history of Bavaria has been worked on since the late 1990s. Work on the lexicon began in February 2005, the first articles on the module Weimar Republic were published in May 2006. By the end of 2015, the HLB, which had been expanded with modules on the Late Middle Ages in 2007 and the post-1945 period in 2008, had grown to 966 articles. The aim of the HLB is to provide comprehensive coverage of all historical eras in Bavaria since the time of prehistory. Authors of the articles are professional historians and experts in their particular field.

The HLB sees itself as part of the Bavarian Regional Library Online which has been developed since 2000. It is also the linked to the Bavarian cultural portal, bavarikon. In 2014/2015 the HLB underwent an extensive technical and optical relaunch. Since then, it has been possible to conduct a search by eras and categories, as well as entering it via a map.

Management structure 
The sponsors of the HLB are the Bavarian State Library (BSB), the Commission for Bavarian Regional History at the Bavarian Academy of Sciences and the Conference of Regional Historians at the Bavarian universities. Its editorial team is located at the Bavarian State Library.

The project leader of the HLB is the head of Bavarica unit of BSB, Stephan Kellner. The lead historian is Ferdinand Kramer, Institute of Bavarian History at the Ludwig Maximilian University of Munich.
Technical support is provided by the Munich Digitization Centre / Digital Library of BSB (Director: Markus Brantl).

Target audience 
The HLB is aimed both at specialist historians as well as that element of the wider public interested in history.

Layout 
The HLB's articles are structured as in a traditional specialist lexicon. It provides information  based on the most current research on particular subjects in compressed form. In addition, the articles are supplemented by short extracts and other information in the form of significant secondary literature, illustrations, primary sources and external links; the HLB thereby benefits from the growing electronic section of the Bavarian State Library and other institutions, by being directly linked to digitised sources and works.

All article content is indexed by standard people and location data. Readers are able to make comments and suggestions to the author of the article via the editorial staff.

Literature 
 Matthias Bader: Das Historische Lexikon Bayerns. Mit dem Lexikon entsteht erstmals ein umfassendes online-Nachschlagewerk zur bayerischen Geschichte … In: Bibliotheksforum Bayern 7 (2013), p. 15
 Ellen Latzin: Bayerische Geschichte im Internet. Das Historische Lexikon Bayerns. In: Zeitschrift für bayerische Landesgeschichte 69 (2006), pp. 993–1004
 Florian Sepp: Das Historische Lexikon Bayerns. In: Akademie aktuell / Bayerische Akademie der Wissenschaften, 2007, pp. 14–17
 Florian Sepp: Das Historische Lexikon Bayerns: ein Internet-Lexikon zur bayerischen Geschichte. In: Jahrbuch der historischen Forschung in der Bundesrepublik Deutschland 2006 (2007), pp. 109–114
 Florian Sepp: Das Spätmittelalter im World Wide Web; 800 Artikel im Historischen Lexikon Bayerns behandeln die spätmittelalterliche Geschichte Altbayerns, Frankens, Schwabens und der Pfalz. In: Akademie aktuell / Bayerische Akademie der Wissenschaften, 2010, pp. 26–27

References

External links 
 Website
 bavarikon
 Bayerische Landesbibliothek Online (BLO)

Encyclopedias of history
German online encyclopedias
History of Bavaria